Arkaba or Arkaba Station is a part-perpetual lease, part-freehold property located about  north east of Hawker and  south of Blinman in the Flinders Ranges in the state of South Australia,

The property is composed of sandstone bluffs, open plains and creek beds studded with river red gums. The natural amphitheatre of Wilpena Pound lies at the northern boundary of the property.

The word 'arkaba' is said to mean land of abundance in the local Adnyamathanha language.

History 
The station was initially leased by William James Browne and his brother John Harris Browne in 1851. The brothers had previously run other properties including Lyndoch, Moorak, Buckland Park, and Booborowie.

Put up for auction in 1863 by the managers, Messrs George and Frank Marchant, the station was stocked with approximately 27,000 sheep and was described as occupying an area of  consisting of lightly timbered country, permanently watered and assessed to carry nearly 35,000 sheep. The reserve price was not met and the property was withdrawn for private sale.

An employee drowned at Arkaba in 1872 when he tried to save some camp appliances from Mundy Creek that was flooded at the time. The man, George Hocart, was moving sheep in the area with several other men when the accident happened.

An inquest into a suicide at the station was held in 1873 when the postmaster and storekeeper, George Thompson, took an overdose of laudanum. His body was found by his daughter, and the station manager, George Parkins, attempted to resuscitate him with no effect. The inquest ruled that Thompson had taken his own life under a fit of temporary insanity.

The station also produced wheat in addition to grazing sheep.

A swagman was found dead in a hut at Arkaba in 1897, but no inquest was held.

A South Australian shearing record was set at Arkaba with the shearer H. R. Cutter shearing 277 sheep in 8 hours. The previous record was set in 1912 by a shearer from Wooltana Station completing 274. At this time the property was owned by Mr. O. G. Bartholomaeun.

The area experienced torrential rain for three days in the summer of 2007 which inundated much of the Flinders Ranges. Arkaba received  over the three days, which is about three times the monthly average. The then owner, Dean Rasheed, said it was the largest flood in his lifetime and probably the largest since European settlement. The homestead was not damaged but much of the family cemetery was swept away.

The property was sold in 2009 by the Rasheed family for $2.5 million to tourism operator, Wild Bush Luxury, which also own properties at Ningaloo in Western Australia and Bamurru Plains in the Northern Territory. After a $1 million refurbishment, the homestead was opened in November of the same year. Abercrombie & Kent listed the station in its top ten semi-adventure travel destinations in 2010. Nicole Kidman is listed among those who have stayed at Arkaba. The property was placed on the market again in 2012 for over 4 million. The property was taken off the market in 2014 and then completely destocked of sheep the same year.

The property presently operates as a tourism resort and as a private wildlife conservancy.

See also
List of ranches and stations

References

Stations (Australian agriculture)
Pastoral leases in South Australia
Flinders Ranges
1851 establishments in Australia
Far North (South Australia)